Tosirips perpulchrana is a moth of the family Tortricidae. It is found in the Russian Far East (Amur, Siberia), north-eastern China (Heilongjiang, Jilin, Liaoning), Korea, Japan and Taiwan.

The wingspan is 19–21 mm for males and 25–27 mm for females. The ground colour of the forewings is yellow ochreous with brownish-grey suffusions and strigulations (fine streaks). The hindwings are grey brown. Adults are on wing in June.

The larvae feed on Salix koreensis.

Subspecies
Tosirips perpulchrana perpulchrana (Russian Far East, north-eastern China, Korea and Taiwan)
Tosirips perpulchrana ceramus Razowski, 1987 (Japan)

References

Moths described in 1901
Archipini
Moths of Japan